Josefina Acosta de Barón (born June 12, 1897) was a Colombian composer, pianist, and teacher.

Acosta was born in Bogotá, and studied at the Academia Beethoven in that city beginning in 1905, taking lessons in theory, solfeggio, and harmony with Santos Cifuentes and piano with María de Cifuentes. Beginning in 1909 she took piano lessons with Eliseo Hernández and Honorio Alarcón, and lessons in harmony with Guillermo Uribe Holguín; these continued until 1912. In 1931 she traveled to Barcelona, where at the Academia Marshall she studied under Mass y Serracán and Manuel Burges. In 1917 in her hometown, she founded the Centro Musical de Chapinero, directing the organization until 1929. From 1936 until 1945 she taught at the conservatory in Ibagué. As a composer, Acosta produced mainly works for her own instrument, although her output also encompasses some religious works. Her pupils included Oscar Buenaventura Buenaventura. The year of her death is unknown.

References

1897 births
Year of death unknown
Colombian composers
Music educators
Colombian pianists
20th-century classical composers
20th-century classical pianists
20th-century Colombian educators
Musicians from Bogotá
Women music educators
Women classical pianists
20th-century women composers
20th-century women educators
20th-century women pianists